This is the discography of Chicano rapper Lil Rob.

Albums

Studio albums

Extended plays
The Last Laff EP (2001)

Remix albums
 DJ Supermix (2000)
 High Till I Die: Remix 2000 (2003)
 The Best of Lil Rob & Mr. Sancho Super Megamix (2009)

Compilations
 Still Smokin''' (2000)
 Greatest Hits Non-Stop (2004)
 Gangster Classics (2005)
 Instrumentals (2005)
 Best of Lil Rob (2008)
 Lil Rob's Oldie Collection (2010)

Mixtapes
 Uncut for the Calles: The Mextape (2007)
 Everything to Me (2011)
 It's My Time'' (2012)

Singles

References

External links
Lil Rob discography at AllMusic
Lil Rob discography at Discogs

Discographies of American artists
Hip hop discographies